Kyle Jarred "Flip" Filipowski (born November 7, 2003) is an American college basketball player for the Duke Blue Devils of the Atlantic Coast Conference (ACC). He was a consensus five-star recruit and one of the top players in the 2022 class.

High school career
Filipowski first attended Minisink Valley High School in Slate Hill, New York. He transferred after his freshman year to Fordham Preparatory School in The Bronx. After his sophomore year, he transferred to Wilbraham & Monson Academy in Wilbraham, Massachusetts. He was the Gatorade Basketball Player of the Year for Massachusetts in 2021. He was ineligible to play in the 2022 McDonald's All-American Boys Game due to being a fifth year player.

Recruiting
Filipowski was a consensus five-star recruit and one of the top players in the 2022 class, according to major recruiting services. On July 29, 2021, he committed to playing college basketball for Duke.

Career stats

College

|-
| style="text-align:left;"|2022–23
| style="text-align:left;"|Duke
| 34 || 34 || 29.0 || .446 || .297 || .774 || 9.0 || 1.6 || 1.2 || .8 || 15.4
|-
|- class="sortbottom"
| style="text-align:center;" colspan="2"| Career
| 34 || 34 || 29.0 || .446 || .297 || .774 || 9.0 || 1.6 || 1.2 || .8 || 15.4

Personal life
His twin brother, Matt, played with Kyle at Wilbraham & Monson and committed to playing college basketball for Harvard.

References

External links
Duke Blue Devils bio
ESPN profile
USA Basketball bio

2003 births
Living people
American men's basketball players
Basketball players from New York (state)
Centers (basketball)
Duke Blue Devils men's basketball players
People from Middletown, Orange County, New York
Power forwards (basketball)